The 1975 Bulgarian Cup Final was the 35th final of the Bulgarian Cup (in this period the tournament was named Cup of the Soviet Army), and was contested between Slavia Sofia and Lokomotiv Sofia on 21 June 1975 at Vasil Levski National Stadium in Sofia. Slavia won the final 3–2.

Match

Details

See also
1974–75 A Group

References

Bulgarian Cup finals
PFC Slavia Sofia matches
Cup Final